Amblyopinae is a subfamily of elongated mud-dwelling gobies commonly called  eel gobies or worm gobies; it has been regarded as a subfamily of the family Gobiidae, while the 5th edition Fishes of the World classifies it as a subfamily of the family Oxudercidae. The members in the subfamily  have two dorsal fins that are connected by a membranous structure and their eyes are highly reduced in size. They are usually pink, red, or purple in coloration.

Genera
Currently, 15  genera in this subfamily are recognized:
 Amblyotrypauchen Hora, 1924
 Biendongella Prokofiev, 2015 
 Brachyamblyopus Bleeker, 1874
 Caragobius H. M. Smith & Seale, 1906
 Ctenotrypauchen Steindachner, 1867
 Gymnoamblyopus Murdy & Ferraris, 2003
 Karsten Murdy, 2002 
 Odontamblyopus Bleeker, 1874
 Paratrypauchen Murdy, 2008
 Pseudotrypauchen Hardenberg, 1931
 Sovvityazius Prokofiev, 2015 
 Taenioides Lacépède, 1800
 Trypauchen Valenciennes, 1837
 Trypauchenichthys Bleeker, 1860
 Trypauchenopsis Volz, 1903

References

 
Oxudercidae
Taxa named by Albert Günther